MicroEMACS is a small, portable Emacs-like text editor originally written by Dave Conroy in 1985, and further developed by Daniel M. Lawrence (1958–2010) and was maintained by him. MicroEMACS has been ported to many operating systems, including CP/M, MS-DOS, Microsoft Windows, VMS, Atari ST, AmigaOS, OS-9, NEXTSTEP, and various Unix-like operating systems.

Variants of MicroEMACS also exist, such as mg, a more GNU Emacs-compatible editor. Many relationships to contemporary editors can also be found in MicroEMACS. The vi clone vile was derived from an older version of MicroEMACS.

University of Washington's simple text editor Pico was based on MicroEMACS 3.6. Pico's featureset and interface would later be emulated in the free software clone GNU nano due to its ambiguous licensing terms.

Linus Torvalds, creator of Linux, has been a user of MicroEMACS since his days as a student at the University of Helsinki.

See also

 List of text editors
 Comparison of text editors

References

External links
 Daniel Lawrence's MicroEMACS site
 MicroEMACS 4.0 manual
 Daniel Lawrence's MicroEMACS source updated for 64-bit Windows
 MicroEMACS binaries site
 JASSPA MicroEmacs site
 vile (VI Like Emacs) site
 Emacs Wiki

1985 software
Emacs
Free text editors
DOS text editors
Amiga software
CP/M software
Termcap
Free software programmed in C